Dr. Kokastien is the second mixtape by American recording artist Kokane. It was released on July 1, 2012 via Bud E Boy Entertainment, a follow-up to Kokane's eighth full-length studio album, The Legend Continues. The mixtape was hosted by DJ King Assassin and features guest appearances from Aanisah C. Long, Babee Loc, Cavell, E-40, Gorilla Dog, Infiniti, KM.G, Kurupt, Leezy Soprano, Weazel Loc and Young Geezy. The album peaked at number 101 on the US Billboard 200 albums chart.

Track listing 

Sample credits
 Track 8 contains elements from "Ripped Open by Metal Explosions" by Galt MacDermot's First Natural Hair Band
 Track 13 contains elements from "Bounce, Rock, Skate, Roll" by Vaughan Mason & Crew

Chart history

References 

Kokane albums
2012 mixtape albums